Alexander Paterson (30 July 1876 – 13 December 1933) was a Scottish football manager who managed Scottish League clubs Cowdenbeath and Dunfermline Athletic. He began his career in football as a goalkeeper with Hearts of Beath and also served Cowdenbeath as an administrator.

Personal life 
Paterson's sons Bill and Archie both became footballers and he managed them at Cowdenbeath and Dunfermline Athletic respectively.

Honours 
Hearts of Beath
 Fife Cup: 1900–01, 1902–03
 King Cup: 1902–03

Cowdenbeath
 Scottish League Division Two: 1913–14, 1914–15
Scottish League Division Two second-place promotion: 1923–24
Eastern League: 1916–17, 1917–18

Dunfermline Athletic
 Scottish League Division Two: 1925–26

Managerial statistics

References 

Cowdenbeath F.C. managers
Scottish Football League managers
Scottish football managers
Association football goalkeepers
Scottish footballers
1876 births
1933 deaths
Footballers from Fife
People from Hill of Beath
Dunfermline Athletic F.C. managers
Hearts of Beath F.C. players
Scottish Junior Football Association players
Scottish Junior Football Association managers